This is a list of scientific journals covering mathematics with existing Wikipedia articles on them.

Alphabetic list of titles

A

B

C

D

E

F

G

H

I

J

K

L

M

N

O

P

Q

R

S

T

Z

See also
arXiv, an electronic preprint archive
List of computer science journals
List of mathematical physics journals
List of probability journals
List of scientific journals
List of statistics journals

References

External links
A list of formerly only-printed journals, now available in digital form, with links
An essentially complete list of mathematical journals, with abbreviations used by Mathematical Reviews

Lists of academic journals